Fabrizio Mazzotta (born 1 December 1963) is an Italian voice actor and comic book writer.

Biography
Born in Monza, Mazzotta entered a career of voice dubbing for anime, cartoons, movies and other entertainment. He is well known for providing the Italian voice of Krusty the Clown in the animated sitcom The Simpsons and he has served as a dialogue writer for the Italian dubbed versions of shows such as Saved by the Bell, Beverly Hills, 90210 and Party of Five.

As a comic book writer, Mazzotta has assisted with the publications of comic strips featuring characters such as Lupo Alberto and Cattivik. He has even provided Italian dialogue for Mickey Mouse comic book stories.

Dubbing roles

Animation
Krusty the Clown in The Simpsons
Krusty the Clown in The Simpsons Movie
Pinky in Animaniacs
Pinky in Pinky and the Brain
Pinky in Pinky, Elmyra & the Brain
Three Blind Mice in Shrek
Clumsy Smurf in The Smurfs
Clumsy Smurf in The Smurfs 2
The Raven/Crow in Brave
Frankie Da Flea in Tom and Jerry: The Movie
Mac in Jetsons: The Movie

Video games
Krusty the Clown in The Simpsons Game

References

External links

1963 births
Living people
People from Monza
Italian male voice actors
Italian comics writers
Italian voice directors
20th-century Italian male actors
21st-century Italian male actors
20th-century Italian male writers
21st-century Italian male writers